Hearts and Spurs  is a 1925 American silent Western film directed by W.S. Van Dyke and starring Buck Jones, Carole Lombard, and William B. Davidson. The film was partly shot on location in San Bernardino County. It received mixed reviews on its release.

Plot
As described in a film magazine review, Sybil Estabrook, a young Eastern woman visits the ranch where her brother Oscar has been sent to make a man of himself. The brother has gotten himself in the clutches of a gambler who forces him to violate the law in order to pay off his poker debts. Hal, a young man, befriends Sybil and wins her gratitude and saves the brother from disgrace. The gambler is captured and then falls under some sliding boulders and is killed.

Cast

References

Bibliography
 Goble, Alan. The Complete Index to Literary Sources in Film. Walter de Gruyter, 1999.
 Morgan, Michelle. Carole Lombard: Twentieth-Century Star. History Press, 2016.

External links

Lobby card and stills at thescrewballgirl.com
Lantern slide at carole-and-co.livejournal.com

1925 films
1925 Western (genre) films
Films directed by W. S. Van Dyke
Fox Film films
American black-and-white films
Silent American Western (genre) films
1920s English-language films
1920s American films